Pinto is a Portuguese, Spanish, Jewish (Sephardic), and Italian surname. It is a high-frequency surname in all Portuguese-speaking countries and is also widely present in Spanish-speaking countries, Italy, India especially in Mangalore, Karnataka France and Israel. Historically, it has been common among political elites in Portuguese- and Spanish-speaking countries, as numerous presidents, prime ministers, and heads of state have shared the surname.

In many languages, Pinto means "colored" or "painted" as it derives from the Late Latin  and Classical Latin , and in some cases, at least from the same word in the sense "lively or restless person". It is linguistically related to the name of Columbus' ship  La Pinta, meaning "The Painted One", "The Look", or "The Spotted One". Also related, though greatly diverging in meaning, is the unit of measurement pint, which comes from the Old French word  and perhaps ultimately from Vulgar Latin  meaning "painted", for marks painted on the side of a container to show capacity.

Politicians
Aníbal Pinto (1825–1884), President of Chile from 1876 to 1881
António Pinto Soares (1780–1865), Head of State of Costa Rica in 1842
Cyril Pinto Jayatilake Seneviratne (1918–1984), Sri Lankan Sinhala military officer and politician
Francisco Antonio Pinto (1785–1858), President of Chile from 1827 to 1829
Francisco Pinto Balsemão (born 1937), Prime Minister of Portugal from 1981 to 1983
Germán Serrano Pinto (1940–2016), Vice President of Costa Rica from 1990 to 1994
Ignacio Pinto (1723-1797), head of the Pinto family that revolted against the Portuguese colonialists in Portuguese India
João Franco (1855–1929), Prime Minister of Portugal from 1906 to 1908
John Pinto (1924–2019), Democratic member of the New Mexico Senate
Jorge Nuno Pinto da Costa (born 1937), President of Portuguese sports club F.C. Porto since 1982
José de Magalhães Pinto (1909–1996), Brazilian governor who successfully led a military coup d'etat of the Brazilian government in 1964
José María Orellana Pinto (1872–1926), President of Guatemala from 1921 to 1926
José Sócrates Carvalho Pinto de Sousa, Prime Minister of Portugal from 2005 to 2011
Lakshman Pinto Jayatilaka Senewiratne (born 1957), Sri Lankan Sinhala Member of Parliament

Manuel Pinto da Costa (born 1937), economist and President of São Tomé and Príncipe from 1975 to 1991 and 2011 to 2016
Manuel Pinto da Fonseca (1681–1773), Portuguese nobleman and Grandmaster of the Order of Saint John and sovereign over Malta
Alcino Pinto (1950s–2020), São Toméan politician
Carlos Mota Pinto (1936–1985), Portuguese politician
Elsa Teixeira Pinto, São Toméan politician
José Antonio Pinto Castro (1817–1887), Costa Rican Vice President, politician, and judge
José Concepción Pinto Castro (1829–1898), Costa Rican judge and politician
Manuel Guillermo Pinto (1783–1853), Argentinian general
Manuel Pinto (Scouting) (1938–2008), Ugandan parliamentarian and Chief Scout
Mário Pinto de Andrade (1928–1990), Angolan politician and poet
Pio Gama Pinto (1927–1965), Kenyan politician
Sérgio Sousa Pinto (born 1972), Portuguese politician and Member of the European Parliament
Shirly Pinto (born 1989), Israeli deaf activist and politician

Sports players
Dirceu José Pinto (1980–2020), Brazilian Paralympic boccia player
João Domingos Pinto (born 1961), Portuguese footballer and manager of FC Porto
José Manuel Pinto (born 1975), Spanish footballer
Raffaele Pinto (1945–2020), Italian racing driver
Ricardo Sá Pinto (born 1972), former Portuguese international footballer and present coach
Antoine Pinto, (born 1991), French Muay Thai kickboxer
António Pinto (athlete) (born 1966), Portuguese long-distance runner
João Vieira Pinto (born 1971), Portuguese footballer
Keivi Pinto (born 1979), Venezuelan judoka
René Pinto (born 1996), Venezuelan baseball player
Renyel Pinto (born 1982), baseball pitcher
Ricardo Pinto (baseball) (born 1994), Venezuelan baseball player
Ricardo Pinto (footballer, born 1965), Brazilian footballer
Ricardo Pinto (footballer, born 1993), Portuguese footballer
Shane Pinto, (born 2000), American ice hockey player

Religious leaders
Chaim Pinto (1748–1845), leading rabbi in Morocco 
Isaac de Pinto (1717–1787), Jewish philosophe and scholar who was a key investor in the Dutch East India Company
Josiah ben Joseph Pinto (1565–1648), Syrian rabbi and author
Yoshiyahu Yosef Pinto (born 1973), Israeli Jewish spiritual leader and Kabbalist
Evarist Pinto (born 1933), Pakistani Catholic priest, 4th Archbishop of Karachi, Pakistan
Zinia Pinto (1929-2013), Pakistani Catholic nun and teacher

Explorers
Fernão Mendes Pinto (c. 1509–1583), Portuguese explorer and writer
Alexandre de Serpa Pinto (aka Serpa Pinto) (1846–1900), Portuguese explorer of southern Africa and colonial administrator

Writers
Ricardo Pinto (novelist) (born 1961), UK-based fantasy writer
Sara Pinto Coelho (1913–1990), Portuguese writer of fiction and plays
Silvia Corzo (born 1973), Colombian lawyer, journalist and newscaster
Vivian de Sola Pinto (1895–1969), British poet, literary critic and historian

Academics
Aníbal Pinto Santa Cruz (1919–1996), Chilean economist
Diana Pinto (historian) (born 1949), intellectual historian on Jewish identity
Jorge Pinto Rodríguez (born 1944), Chilean historian

Other
Freida Pinto (born 1984), Indian model and actress
Paulo Jr., whose real name is Paulo Xisto Pinto Jr., Brazilian bassist of the heavy metal band Sepultura
Dan Pinto (born 1960), American composer, keyboardist and drummer-percussionist
Diana Pinto, Miss India America 2009
Filipe Pinto (born 1988), Portuguese singer and winner of 2009/2010 Ídolos
George Pinto (composer) (1785–1806), English composer and keyboard virtuoso
Joaquim Pinto (born 1957), Portuguese film director
Malucha Pinto (born 1955), Chilean actress and dramatist
Maria Pinto (fashion designer) (born 1957), American fashion designer
Sam Pinto (born 1989), Filipina model and actress
Thomas Pinto (1728–1773), British violinist

People with the given name or nickname
Pinto Colvig (1892–1967), United States actor, cartoonist, and circus performer
Pinto Itamaraty (born 1960), Brazilian politician
Pinto Machado (1926–2009), Portuguese footballer

See also
Pinter (surname)

References

Portuguese-language surnames
Sephardic surnames
Spanish-language surnames
Italian-language surnames
Maghrebi Jewish surnames

fr:Pinto